The 1971 Delaware Fightin' Blue Hens football team was an American football team that represented the University of Delaware as an independent during the 1971 NCAA College Division football season. In their seventh season under head coach Tubby Raymond, the team compiled a 10–1 record and was voted No. 1 in the AP and UPI small college polls.

The team played its home games at Delaware Stadium in Newark, Delaware. Ralph Borgess was the team captain.

Schedule

References

Delaware
Delaware Fightin' Blue Hens football seasons
NCAA Small College Football Champions
Delaware Fightin' Blue Hens football